Shuang Xuetao (born September 8, 1983 in Shenyang), is a contemporary Chinese novelist. He graduated from the Jilin University School of Law.

In 2010, Shuang happened to see that the newly established China Times International Chinese-language Film and Fiction Award was seeking submissions. An employee of the Liaoning branch of the China Development Bank at the time, he wrote his first novel, Gargoyle in just 20 days, winning the award. In 2012, Shuang was shortlisted for the 14th Taipei Literature Awards, winning a cash-prize of 200,000 NTD, becoming the first mainland Chinese author to win the prize. That same year, Shuang quit his job to devote himself to writing full-time. In 2015, he left Shenyang to attend further studies in creative writing at Renmin University in Beijing.

Since 2016, Shuang has published the novels Tianwu's Account, Era of the Deaf and Dumb and the short story collections The Aviator, The Hunter, among other works. The short story "Assassinate the Novelist", included in the collection The Aviator, has been adapted into a film of the same name, directed by Ning Hao.

His short story collection Moses on the Plain was translated into English as Rouge Street: Three Novellas by Jeremy Tiang, and published by the Metropolitan Books imprint of Henry Holt and Company in April 2022.

Major works 
Novellas

 Gargoyle
 Era of the Deaf and Dumb
 Tianwu's Account

Short story collections

 Moses on the Plain
 The Aviator
 The Hunter

Works in translation
 The Master, translated by Michael Day. In Pathways, Winter 2015.
 Rouge street : three novellas, translated by Jeremy Tiang. New York : Metropolitan Books/Henry Holt and Company, 2022. . Contains 3 novellas:
 The aeronaut
 Bright hall
 Moses on the plain

Awards 
 2010 China Times International Chinese-language Film and Fiction Award, First Place
 2012 14th Taipei Literature Awards, Annuity
 2016 Chinese-language Literature Media, Award Most Promising Newcomer of the Year
 2017 Wang Zengqi Chinese-language Fiction Award, Best Short Story

References 

1983 births
Living people
Chinese novelists
Jilin University alumni
21st-century Chinese novelists
People from Shenyang